Close-Up Vol. 1, Love Songs is a studio album release by New York-based singer/songwriter and musician Suzanne Vega. The album consists of re-recordings of songs from Vega's back catalogue with stripped-down arrangements that highlight her lyrics and melodies.

Love Songs is the first volume of Vega's Close-Up Collection which were released over the next two years; and was followed by the albums People and Places, States of Being and Songs of Family.

A "Deluxe Edition" available exclusively on iTunes includes four extra tracks.

Track listing

Release history

References

External links 
Love Songs Review – Love Songs Review by SLUG Magazine

2010 albums
Suzanne Vega albums